The Norwegian Association of International Shooters Medal is a marksmanship medal awarded by Norway.

Qualifications
Rifle shooting is conducted 300 meters from a 1.5-meter target or 200 meters from a 1-meter standard international target. The target must be graded by Norwegian range personnel.

Weapons Class A

Precision rifle

Program:
3 shots in each position (standing/kneeling) 
A total of 6 shots constitutes a trial.

Main shooting:
10 shots lying down in 3 minutes.
10 shots kneeling in 4 minutes.
A total of 20 shots in 7 minutes.

Weapons Class B

Standard military rifle with open sights

Program:
3 shots in each position (standing/kneeling) 
A total of 6 shots constitutes a trial.

Main shooting:
10 shots lying down in 3 minutes.
10 shots kneeling in 4 minutes.
A total of 20 shots in 7 minutes.

Targets are to be marked after each series.

Administrative
The protocol requires that scores be entered by both the unit commander and the shooting instructor. The instructor maintains the records.

Scale Class A (Precision Rifle)
Golden medal class A: 185 points
Silver medal class A: 170 points
Bronze medal class A: 160 points

Scale Class B (Standard Army Rifle)
Golden medal class B: 175 points
Silver medal class B: 160 points
Bronze medal class B: 150 points

Orders, decorations, and medals of Norway